Priolepis is a genus of fish in the family Gobiidae with a cosmopolitan distribution.

Species
There are currently 35 recognized species in this genus:
 Priolepis agrena R. Winterbottom & M. E. Burridge, 1993 (Network reefgoby)
 Priolepis ailina R. Winterbottom & M. E. Burridge, 1993
 Priolepis aithiops R. Winterbottom & M. E. Burridge, 1992 (Drab reefgoby)
 Priolepis akihitoi Hoese & Larson, 2010 (Emperor reefgoby) 
 Priolepis anthioides (J. L. B. Smith, 1959)
 Priolepis ascensionis (C. E. Dawson & A. J. Edwards, 1987)
 Priolepis aureoviridis (Gosline, 1959) (Yellow-green reefgoby)
 Priolepis borea (Snyder, 1909)
 Priolepis cincta (Regan, 1908) (Girdled reefgoby)
 Priolepis compita R. Winterbottom, 1985 (Crossroads reefgoby)
 Priolepis cyanocephala Hoese & Larson, 2010 
 Priolepis dawsoni D. W. Greenfield, 1989
 Priolepis eugenia (D. S. Jordan & Evermann, 1903) (Noble reefgoby)
 Priolepis fallacincta R. Winterbottom & M. E. Burridge, 1992 (Eight-bar reefgoby)
 Priolepis farcimen (D. S. Jordan & Evermann, 1903) (Farcimen reefgoby)
 Priolepis goldshmidtae Goren & Baranes, 1995
 Priolepis hipoliti (Metzelaar, 1922) (Rusty reefgoby)
 Priolepis inhaca (J. L. B. Smith, 1949) (Brick reefgoby)
 Priolepis kappa R. Winterbottom & M. E. Burridge, 1993 (Kappa reefgoby)
 Priolepis latifascima R. Winterbottom & M. E. Burridge, 1993
 Priolepis limbatosquamis (Gosline, 1959) (Rimmed-scaled reefgoby)
 Priolepis melanops Bogorodsky, T. Suzuki & A. O. Mal, 2016 (Black-faced reefgoby) 
 Priolepis nocturna (J. L. B. Smith, 1957) (Black-barred reefgoby)
 Priolepis nuchifasciata (Günther, 1873) (Orange reefgoby)
 Priolepis pallidicincta R. Winterbottom & M. E. Burridge, 1993 (Pale-barred reefgoby)
 Priolepis profunda (M. C. W. Weber, 1909) (Narrow-bar reefgoby)
 Priolepis psygmophilia R. Winterbottom & M. E. Burridge, 1993 (Latticed reefgoby)
 Priolepis randalli R. Winterbottom & M. E. Burridge, 1992 (Randall's reefgoby)
 Priolepis robinsi Garzón-Ferreira & Acero P, 1991
 Priolepis semidoliata (Valenciennes, 1837) (Half-barred reefgoby)
 Priolepis squamogena R. Winterbottom & M. E. Burridge, 1989 (Scaled-cheek reefgoby)
 Priolepis sticta R. Winterbottom & M. E. Burridge, 1992 (Dappled reefgoby)
 Priolepis triops R. Winterbottom & M. E. Burridge, 1993
 Priolepis vexilla R. Winterbottom & M. E. Burridge, 1993 (Ribbon reefgoby)
 Priolepis winterbottomi Nogawa & Endo, 2007

References

 
Gobiinae
Marine fish genera
Taxa named by Achille Valenciennes
Taxonomy articles created by Polbot